Karl Kõiv (3 December 1894 – 24 April 1972) was an Estonian featherweight weightlifter who won a silver medal at the 1922 World Weightlifting Championships and placed seventh at the 1920 Summer Olympics. In 1922–25 he headed the weightlifting section of the Estonian Sports Union. Later he worked as a weightlifting coach and referee, and in this capacity attended the 1936 Summer Olympics.

References

1894 births
1974 deaths
Sportspeople from Tartu
People from the Governorate of Livonia
Weightlifters at the 1920 Summer Olympics
Olympic weightlifters of Estonia
Estonian male weightlifters
World Weightlifting Championships medalists